Gianduia or gianduja is a homogeneous blend of chocolate with 30% hazelnut paste, invented in Turin during Napoleon's regency (1796–1814). It can be consumed in the form of bars or as a filling for chocolates.

Gianduja is basically chocolate stretched with hazelnut butter. Similarly to standard chocolate, it is made in both plain and milk versions. It may also contain other nuts, such as almond. As a bar, gianduja resembles regular chocolate, excepting the fact that it is significantly softer due to the presence of hazelnut oil. With a higher percentage of hazelnut butter, gianduja does not solidify at ambient temperature.

Chocolate hazelnut spreads are also notably inspired from gianduja. They tend to use, however, other ingredients, typically cocoa powder and vegetable oils rather than cocoa butter-based chocolate.

History 
The Continental System, imposed by Napoleon in 1806, prevented British goods from entering European ports under French control, putting a strain on cocoa supplies.  A chocolatier in Turin named Michele Prochet extended the little chocolate he had by mixing it with hazelnuts from the Langhe hills south of Turin. It is unclear when solid gianduja was made for the first time, solid chocolate dating from the early 19th century only. It is however known that, in 1852, Turin-based chocolate manufacturer Caffarel invented gianduiotto, which is a small ingot-shaped gianduja.

It takes its name from Gianduja, a Carnival and marionette character who represents the archetypal Piedmontese, natives of the Italian region where hazelnut confectionery is common.

See also
 Nutella, which was originally called Pasta Gianduja
 Gianduja (fr.Wikibooks)
 Crema gianduia (it.Wikipedia)

References 

Italian chocolate
Cuisine of Piedmont